The Social Business Channel (otherwise known as SBC) is an online channel based in Irakleio, Attica and the first and only free thematic television channel for the economy in Greece. The station began operating in December 2005 and broadcast many programs on the market, the economy and traffic, in Greek and international markets. SBC, for seventeen whole years from 2005 until 2022, was the only financial channel in Greece, until Naftemporiki TV opened in 2022, and broke the SBC monopoly.

Certification and awards
The SBC was certified according to the international standard of ISO 9001:2000 by Bureau Veritas and was distinguished by the President of Athens Exchange Spyros Capralos during the first meeting of Athens Exchange of 2007. It was also made interviews, which occupied the mass media, as the governor of Bank of Greece George Provopoulos, the head of the ASPIS Group Paul Psomiadis, the former economy minister Giorgos Papakonstantinou, the CEO of Hellas Sat Christodoulos Protopapas, Doctor Kapositas etc.

Partnerships and emission stopping
Collaborating with the most reputable global financial television networks, Bloomberg and RT while the channel projected in all displays of the Athens Exchange.

Coverage

Terrestrial digital and analog
In the first years of its operation, SBC also broadcast terrestrial analog, as a regional station in Attica, but pirated, many times obtaining a temporary and not legal license, entering into various partnerships with several legal regional channels of Attica from 2005 to 2018, in order to produce a program through a terrestrial frequency, through the indirect route, such as with Local TV (now Nickelodeon Greece) - initially it had an informational license, Channel 9 (now One Channel), Channel 10 (later Sunny Channel, today Alert TV), RTP Center Corinth and the memory grinder TV Thessaloniki, the which channels had a certain amount of time to broadcast their program, on the SBC.

In fact, the Sunny Channel violated the broadcasting legislation and by committing commercial management and exploitation of the channel by the SBC company, which is strictly prohibited by law, while RTP Center and TV Thessaloniki were legally forbidden to broadcast it, because they violated many times the legislation, having in fact to a large extent the absence of an autonomous program.

Notable incidents
In the first years of its operation, in 2005 as Satellite Business Channel as it was also broadcasting by satellite, it was considered to be the continuation of the once national station Tempo TV, because it suddenly left its analogue frequency from Hymettus (22 UHF), two years after its final closure, in 2003 (but this is not true, because the two channels were different companies).

In the second beginning, it broadcast from two broadcast centers of Attica, Parnitha (49 UHF) and Hymettus (35 UHF) from where Local TV (now Nickelodeon) was broadcast and at the same time from a second frequency of Hymettus (22 UHF) that had been granted to ERT to broadcast the Parliament channel also from Aegina (50 UHF).

On June 15, 2010, SBC's broadcast is online only following a decision by EETT to interrupt its telecast by Hymettus. The interruption of the station brought a storm of reactions from TV viewers and investors, even leading to the unemployment of 80 workers.

In July of that year, following SBC's imminent discontinuation by Local TV the second station changed ownership and on July 12 returned to its old frequencies (35 and 49 UHF) and old name, rebroadcasting Nickelodeon. On July 31, former executives of the station entered into discussions with Channel 9 in order for SBC to broadcast temporarily through the latter, covering 30% of the television time, while on September 3, Local TV became the current Greek franchise of Nickelodeon. In the end, Channel 9 decided to broadcast instead, a program of original financial shows, hosted by the aforementioned executives and led by Panagiotis Bousborelis, who had also left the SBC station.

On January 14, 2013, Jeronimo Groovy S.A. which owns the regional Sunny Channel (today's Alert TV), had signed a contract with SBC S.A. for the commercial management and exploitation of the channel, something that is strictly prohibited by law, while Sunny itself also fired all its staff, exceeding all limits, with the NCRTV asking for clarification. However, on February 2, SBC started rebroadcasting from Sunny's frequency, replacing it illegally rather than legally.

From March 2013 until July 2014, part of the SBC program was rebroadcast in Thessaloniki and Central Macedonia by the local channel TV Thessaloniki, which has ceased operations.

As of 1 August 2014, SBC is legally mandated to broadcast digitally only via Digea's terrestrial platform from 13 broadcasting centers in Attica and Evia, a year later, Digea then permanently stopped broadcasting SBC forcing Sunny's return whose program was largely degraded by showing old programs and endless hours of telemarketing, which in the spring of 2016 was renamed to today's Alert TV, whose program was also enriched with dozens of news programs supporting far-right politics.

On March 8, 2018, the NCRTV did not recognize SBC's legal right to operate, and as a result, it ordered Digea to stop the station's terrestrial transmission, which was done on the evening of June 20. However the station continued to be broadcast online and satellite via Cosmote TV (channel 654) where it was available from 14 December 2012 until 25 November 2018 while earlier from 8 October 2018 until 2022, SBC was terrestrially rebroadcast from Attica TV as an embedded trading program.

References

External links

Greek-language television stations
Television channels and stations established in 2005
Television channels and stations disestablished in 2010
Defunct television channels in Greece